Tom McLean may refer to:

 Tom McLean (Scottish footballer) (1866–1936), Scottish footballer for Derby County and Notts County
 Tom McLean (footballer, born 1931) (1931–2017), Australian footballer for Melbourne and North Melbourne
 Tom McLean (footballer, born 1876) (1876–1948), Australian footballer for Collingwood and Geelong
 Tom McLean (trade unionist) (1877/78–1957), English trade union leader
 Tom McLean (scientist), British chemist
Thomas MacLean, British musician and multi-instrumentalist

See also
 Tom McClean (born 1942), British Army veteran and survival expert